Mary Lynn Rajskub (born June 22, 1971) is an American actress and comedian who is best known for portraying Chloe O'Brian in the action thriller series 24, and the character Gail the Snail in It's Always Sunny in Philadelphia. Rajskub was a regular cast member on HBO's Mr. Show with Bob and David, and she has appeared in such films as Dude, Where's My Car?, Sweet Home Alabama, Punch-Drunk Love, Mysterious Skin, Little Miss Sunshine, Sunshine Cleaning, Safety Not Guaranteed, and The Kings of Summer, among others.

Early life
Rajskub was raised in Trenton, Michigan, having moved there from Detroit. She is the daughter of Betty and Tony Rajskub and has two older sisters.

Rajskub played the clarinet in a school band and portrayed Frenchie in the musical Grease. One of her childhood inspirations was the television series Moonlighting.

During the early nineties, she often performed at various open mics in San Francisco.

She later moved to Los Angeles working as a waitress in a Hard Rock Cafe and a ticket-taker at the Beverly Center movie theater.

Career
Rajskub's first part was as an Oompa-Loompa in a community theater production of Willy Wonka & the Chocolate Factory, and her first starring role was Raggedy Ann. In 1996 she appeared in music videos for the songs "The Good Life" by Weezer and "The New Pollution" by Beck.

Rajskub was one of the original cast members of Mr. Show with Bob and David. From 1996–1998, she had a recurring role on the HBO series The Larry Sanders Show as booking assistant Mary Lou Collins.

Her most notable role is CTU systems analyst Chloe O'Brian on 24, which she joined in 2003 at the start of the show's third season. Her character was a hit with viewers and critics and was one of the few cast members to return in the show's fourth season. After being a regular guest star for two seasons, Rajskub became a main cast member in the show's fifth season. By the end of the series, she was the lead female, with top billing second only to Kiefer Sutherland. Her character also had the honor of saying the final words of the series in the season 8 series finale. Rajskub and Sutherland appeared briefly as their 24 characters in a 2007 episode, "24 Minutes", of the Fox animated series The Simpsons. In August 2013, it was announced that she would reprise her Chloe O'Brian role in the 2014 limited series 24: Live Another Day.

Rajskub appeared in Kelsey Grammer's The Sketch Show on Fox Television, The King of Queens as a character named Priscilla, and in numerous films including  Mysterious Skin, Legally Blonde 2, Sweet Home Alabama, Dude, Where's My Car?, Man on the Moon, Punch-Drunk Love, The Anniversary Party, Firewall, Little Miss Sunshine, music videos for Beck, Weezer and Sheryl Crow, as well as portraying a blind woman in the film Road Trip.

Rajskub was part of a comic duo (with Karen Kilgariff) called Girls Guitar Club. In 2006, she made a cameo appearance in "Partings", the 6th season finale of Gilmore Girls, where she played a trobairitz looking for her big break. (Rajskub had previously appeared on Gilmore Girls as the female lead in A Film by Kirk, a short film made by the character Kirk Gleason.) She has volunteered as an actress with the Young Storytellers Program. She has an educational background as a painter, having attended the San Francisco Art Institute.

Rajskub has been nominated twice for a Screen Actors Guild Award; once in 2005, and again in 2007 for Outstanding Performance by an Ensemble in a Drama Series. She guest-starred on Flight of the Conchords episode "Prime Minister" as Karen, an Art Garfunkel fanatic. She guest-starred as "Gail the Snail" in an episode of It's Always Sunny in Philadelphia titled "The Gang Gives Frank an Intervention", and reprised the role in the ninth-season finale, "The Gang Squashes Their Beefs," and season thirteen's "The Gang Beats Boggs: Ladies Reboot." In 2009, she also appeared in the film Julie & Julia as Sarah, one of Julie Powell's close friends. In 2010, Rajskub performed stand-up on John Oliver's New York Stand Up Show. In June 2010, she appeared in the "Lovesick" episode during the second season of the USA series Royal Pains.

From July through October 2010, she performed in her solo show, Mary Lynn Spreads Her Legs, at the Steve Allen Theater in Los Angeles. Reviewer F. Kathleen Foley of the Los Angeles Times wrote "that cheerfully vulgar title sums up the overall tone, which is often breezily obscene".  The show, written by Rajskub with help from director/developer Amit Itelman, was inspired by Rajskub's experiences with pregnancy, childbirth, and early motherhood.

In January 2011, Rajskub guest-starred in the episode "Our Children, Ourselves" on the second season of ABC's Modern Family. In the fall of 2011, Rajskub appeared in the short-lived sitcom How to Be a Gentleman. Also in 2011, Rajskub's web series, Dicki, began airing on My Damn Channel. Dicki is based on a number of people that Rajskub grew up with in and around Michigan. The title character is a 40-year-old woman who lives at home with her parents, makes crafts, and takes her art seriously. Dicki has been one of My Damn Channel's most successful web series to date. The first season concluded in November 2011, but a second season is currently in development. Rajskub performed in the June 2012 edition of Don't Tell My Mother! (Live Storytelling), a monthly showcase in which celebrities share true stories they would never want their mothers to know. In 2012 she began hosting a podcast on the Nerdist Network called Kickin' it Mary Lynn Style.

In 2013, Rajskub appeared in the fourth season of Arrested Development in a silent yet well-received role as Heartfire, a character Rajskub has said "speak[s] from the heart, but do[es]n't use any words." In the same year Rajskub also appeared in the web series All Growz Up with Melinda Hill.

Rajskub appeared on Ken Reid's TV Guidance Counselor podcast on March 27, 2015.

In August 2016, Rajskub appeared at the Edinburgh Festival Fringe in 24 Hours With Mary Lynn Rajskub and it was well-received by fans and critics.

In 2017, Rajskub appeared in the first season of the Adult Swim series Dream Corp LLC, playing Patient 46 in the episode "Are You Down With OCD?".

In 2018, Rajskub appeared in Night School.

In 2021, Rajskub released a 49-minute comedy special called Mary Lynn Rajskub: Live from the Pandemic.

Personal life
Rajskub dated David Cross, who introduced her to Mr. Show and left the show when they broke up after the end of the second season. Afterwards, she dated music producer Jon Brion for five years until they broke up in the fall of 2002. Rajskub later dated comedian Duncan Trussell.

Rajskub met personal trainer Matthew Rolph when he approached her after one of her comedy sets. They began dating, and she became pregnant three months later. Their son was born in 2008. Rajskub married Rolph on August 1, 2009, in an impromptu wedding in Las Vegas. Rajskub filed for divorce in June 2019.

Rajskub is bisexual and discussed her past relationships with women in an article for AfterEllen.com.

Filmography

Film

Television

References

External links 

 
 Mary Lynn Rajskub Interview on Fox News Radio
 Dicki, a series of wepisodes written by and starring Mary Lynn Rajskub

Actresses from Michigan
American film actresses
American sketch comedians
American stand-up comedians
American television actresses
American television writers
Living people
People from Greater Los Angeles
American women comedians
People from Trenton, Michigan
People from Detroit
20th-century American actresses
21st-century American actresses
Bisexual actresses
Comedians from Michigan
Bisexual comedians
LGBT people from Michigan
20th-century American comedians
21st-century American comedians
Screenwriters from Michigan
American women television writers
Place of birth missing (living people)
1971 births
American bisexual actors
American LGBT comedians